Trupanea formosae is a species of tephritid or fruit flies in the genus Trupanea of the family Tephritidae.

Distribution
Taiwan.

References

Tephritinae
Insects described in 1927
Diptera of Asia